(born June 13, 1968 in Fukuoka, Fukuoka Prefecture, Japan), better known by her stage name  is a female Japanese singer and tarento. Moriguchi is affiliated with the talent agency NoReason Inc., where she also serves as Second Production Department Manager.

Biography 
The youngest of four sisters,  lived with her mother after her parents divorced when she was eight years old. She graduated from Fukuoka City Takamiya Junior High School and Fukuoka Prefectural Fukuoka Chuo High School, then transferred to Horikoshi High School Performing Arts Course. Her classmates included Yōko Oginome, Kumiko Takeda, Miyuki Imori, Sayuri Iwai, Eri Murata, and Mie Takahashi. During her teenage years, Hanamura performed as a backing singer in the Tokyo Music Academy performing arts group . Before graduating from high school, she participated in several variety shows and quiz programs. She auditioned for several idol singer competitions without success. Hanamura adopted the stage name "Hiroko Moriguchi" as a nod to musician Masaaki Hirao and female golfer Yuko Moriguchi.

After finishing second place in NHK's , Moriguchi signed with King Records and released her debut single  for the anime TV series Mobile Suit Zeta Gundam. The song reached No. 16 on Oricon's charts. Her follow-up songs, however, failed to achieve the same success. In 1987, Moriguchi recorded the song  to promote the Kirin Lemon Whity drink. While the beverage sold well in Japan, the song was unable to make the Top 100 chart.

In 1988, Moriguchi recorded the song  for the anime series Yoroiden Samurai Troopers. Moriguchi also released her first gravure idol book and video  that year and her second gravure book Wow! in 1990.

In 1991, Moriguchi recorded  for the anime film Mobile Suit Gundam F91. The song reached No. 9 on Oricon's charts and stayed in the Top 100 for 27 weeks. It also placed 47th in Oricon's annual ranking and consistently placed in NHK's Kōhaku Uta Gassen for six consecutive years, making it her biggest hit. She also recorded songs for the Fuji TV variety show  and was a mainstay during its run from 1992 to 1995. Moriguchi released her third gravure book Cool in 1997. Throughout the 1990s, she appeared in television commercials for companies such as Kao Corporation, National, Daihatsu, and Asahi Breweries.

In 2003, Moriguchi played Hiroko in the NHK TV series  and made appearances in the TBS series . In 2005, she was appointed as general manager of the Japan Amateur Baseball Association team . However, she and co-manager Nobuyuki Kagawa resigned following a reorganization of the team, which as since been renamed .

On February 28, 2012, Moriguchi joined Yoko Minamino and Tomomi Nishimura to form the trio "Blooming Girls". Their debut single "Knock!! Knock!! Knock!!" peaked at No. 66 on Oricon's singles charts on June 13. In 2015, Moriguchi released the single  to commemorate her 30th anniversary in the music business. Since 2017, Moriguchi has been a participant in Nippon BS Broadcasting's , held every New Year's Eve.

Moriguchi released Gundam Song Covers on August 7, 2019 to commemorate the 40th anniversary of the Gundam franchise. The album reached No. 3 on Oricon's Weekly Album Chart on August 16, making it her first top-10 album since 1991's Eternal Songs. On November 16, 2019, the album was announced as one of six recipients of the Planning Award at the 61st Japan Record Awards, which was held on December 30. Moriguchi's follow-up album Gundam Song Covers 2 was originally planned for release on June 10, 2020, but due to the ongoing COVID-19 pandemic, the release date was pushed to September 16, 2020.

In June 2021, Moriguchi announced the release of her 35th anniversary album  on August 4. It was her first original studio release since her 1997 album Happy Happy Blue. Moriguchi also hosted a special concert at the Tokyo International Forum Hall C on October 3. In December 2021, Moriguchi announced the release of Gundam Song Covers 3 on March 9, 2022.

Following the release of Gundam Song Covers 3, Bandai Namco announced that Moriguchi would record "Ubugoe" as the theme song of the film Mobile Suit Gundam: Cucuruz Doan's Island. "Ubugoe" peaked at No. 10 on Oricon's charts, becoming her first top-10 since "Whistle" in 1993.

On March 4, 2023, Moriguchi announced the release of Anison Covers on May 24. The album features her covers of popular anime theme songs from the 1980s and 1990s.

Moriguchi currently co-hosts the variety show Anison Days alongside singer/songwriter Mikio Sakai on BS11. She is also the host of her own radio show Kiss & Smile on Bay FM 78.

Personal life 
During the 1990s, Moriguchi suffered from cold sensitivity. Starting in 2000, she changed her diet and sleeping habits to remedy her condition.

Discography 

 Mizu no Hoshi e Ai wo Komete (1985)
 Prime Privacy (1989)
 Tranquility -Yasashii Hoshi de- (1991)
 Hikkoshi wo Suru yo! (1992)
 Issho ni Aruite Ikeru (1993)
 Ashita Genki Nina are (1993)
 Let's Go (1994)
 Parade (1995)
 Kitto Aitaku Narudeshō (1996)
 Happy Happy Blue (1997)
 Gundam Song Covers (2019)
 Gundam Song Covers 2 (2020)
 Aoi Inochi (2021)
 Gundam Song Covers 3 (2022)
 Anison Covers (2023)

Bibliography 
  (Fresh Scholar, 1988 May)
 Wow (Scholar, 1990 April)
 Cool (Bunkasha, 1997 June)
  (2015 April)

Filmography

TV

Kōhaku Uta Gassen appearances

References

External links
  
  (King Records) 
 Official profile at NoReason 
 
 
 

1968 births
Living people
Japanese actresses
Japanese idols
Japanese women pop singers
Japanese women singer-songwriters
Anime singers
People from Fukuoka
Musicians from Fukuoka Prefecture
Horikoshi High School alumni
King Records (Japan) artists
20th-century Japanese women singers
20th-century Japanese singers
21st-century Japanese women singers
21st-century Japanese singers